Agavi is a PHP web framework that follows the model–view–controller (MVC) design pattern. It does not use the convention over configuration paradigm, but focuses on design decisions, which allow for better scalability.

See also

Comparison of web frameworks

References

External links

Basic FAQ

Free computer libraries
Free software programmed in PHP
Web frameworks